Mount Skokomish Wilderness is a designated wilderness area in the southeast portion of Olympic National Forest on the Olympic Peninsula of Washington in the United States. The wilderness area comprises  administered by the U.S. Forest Service.

History
In 1984, the U.S. Congress established five wilderness areas within Olympic National Forest:
 Buckhorn Wilderness
 Colonel Bob Wilderness
 Mount Skokomish Wilderness
 The Brothers Wilderness
 Wonder Mountain Wilderness

Mount Skokomish Wilderness sits along the southeast flank of the Olympic Wilderness, which was created in 1988.

Topography
Mount Skokomish Wilderness is located in the southeast corner of Olympic National Forest, just north of Lake Cushman. It consists of two long rocky ridges running roughly northeast to southwest. The northern ridge rises to Mounts Skokomish, Lincoln, and Cruiser, with Sawtooth Ridge, a popular rock-climbing location, stretching between Lincoln and Cruiser. The southern ridge includes the summits of Mounts Pershing, Washington, Rose, Ellinor, Jefferson Peak, and Tran Spire. Between the ridges lies the headwaters basin of the Hamma Hamma River, which gathers its waters from Mildred Lakes and tributary streams in the western portion to flow east across the Wilderness.

Vegetation
Common vegetation in Mount Skokomish Wilderness include old-growth western hemlock, western red cedar, and Douglas fir in the lower elevations.  Higher elevations display various species of firs, pines, and dwarf juniper.

Wildlife

Common wildlife found in Mount Skokomish Wilderness include elk, black-tailed deer, black bear, mountain lion, marmot, and mountain goat.

Recreation
Common recreational activities in Mount Skokomish Wilderness include backpacking, mountain climbing, fishing, and camping. The Mildred Lakes Trail is a primitive trail that has extremely steep pitches and is the major access into the Wilderness. The elevation gain on this trail is 2,100 feet and it is 4.5 miles in length. The Mt. Rose Trail, 4.8 miles, provides steep access to the summit of Mt. Rose at the southern end of the Wilderness.The Putvin Trail, 3.0 miles, accesses the north portion of the Wilderness and is also very steep.

See also
 List of U.S. Wilderness Areas
 List of old growth forests

References

External links
 Mount Skokomish Wilderness U.S. Forest Service
 Mount Skokomish Wilderness Wilderness.net (The University of Montana)

Protected areas of Mason County, Washington
Wilderness areas of Washington (state)
Old-growth forests
Olympic Mountains
Olympic National Forest
1984 establishments in Washington (state)
Protected areas established in 1984